"Honour thy father and thy mother" (Hebrew: כַּבֵּד אֶת אָבִיךָ וְאֶת אִמֶּךָ לְמַעַן יַאֲרִכוּן יָמֶיךָ) is one of the Ten Commandments in the Hebrew Bible. The commandment is generally regarded in Protestant and Jewish sources as the fifth in both the list in Exodus 20:1–21 and in Deuteronomy (Dvarim) 5:1–23. Catholics and Lutherans count this as the fourth.

These commandments were enforced as law in many jurisdictions, and are still considered enforceable law by some. Exodus 20:1 describes the Ten Commandments as being spoken by Yahweh, inscribed on two stone tablets by the finger of God, broken by Moses, and rewritten on replacement stones by the Lord.

Hebrew Bible

In the Torah, keeping this commandment was associated with individual benefit and with the ability of the nation of Israel to remain in the land to which God was leading them. Dishonouring parents by striking or cursing them was punishable by death and so the clause "so that you may live long" could be interpreted as "so that you are not put to death".  In the Talmud, the commandment to honour one's human parents is compared to honoring God. According to the prophet Malachi, God makes the analogy himself:

Judaism

The commandment to honour one's human parents is compared to honouring God, for one owes their existence to their father and their mother.

The Talmud says that since there are three partners in the creation of a person (God and two parents), honour showed to parents is the same as honour shown to God. It also compares a number of similarly constructed passages from the Torah and concludes that honour toward parents and honour toward God are intentionally equated:

Because honouring parents is part of honouring God, the mitzvah does not depend on the worthiness of the parent: "Even if his father is wicked and a sinner, he must fear and revere him ... A convert to Judaism must not curse or despise his non-Jewish father." (Kitzur Shulchan Aruch 143:13,25)

It also requires honour to one's stepparents or an older sibling who is raising one, and one's teachers, though one has a greater obligation to honor a parent than a grandparent.

The commandment is repeated eight times throughout the bible.

Historical beliefs
Keeping this commandment was associated by the Israelites with the ability of the nation of Israel to remain in the land to which God was leading them. According to the Torah, striking or cursing one's father or mother was punishable by immediate death. In Deuteronomy, a procedure is described for parents to bring a persistently disobedient son to the city elders for death by stoning.

Honouring one's parents is also described in the Torah as an analogue to honouring God. According to the prophet Jeremiah, God refers to himself as Father to Israel, and according to the prophet Isaiah, God refers to Israel as his sons and daughters. According to the prophet Malachi, God calls for similar honour.

According to Jeremiah, God blessed the descendants of Rechab for obeying their forefather's command to not drink wine and uses the family as a counterexample to Israel's failure to obey his command to not worship other gods:

Precedence
According to the Mishneh Torah, this commandment requires one to honour both of one's parents equally; there is no greater weight given to either the father or the mother. While in some parts of scripture, the father is stated first, in others, the mother comes first. This shows that the honour due to each is equal.

While Jewish teaching holds that a married woman must honour her husband, there are also guidelines for how she may continue to honour her parents:

Requirements
The commandment requires one to obey one's parents when the command given by a parent is reasonable and permissible under Jewish law. For example, if a parent asks a child to bring him/her water, he/she must obey.  Because honouring God is above all mitzvot, if a parent asks a child to break a law of the Torah, he/she must refuse to obey.

A child is not required to obey if a parent says that he/she must marry a particular person, or must not marry a person he/she wishes to marry, provided the marriage is permissible by Jewish law.

A child who is travelling has an obligation to communicate with his/her parents to let them know he/she is safe in order to prevent them from worrying.

A child must continue to honour his/her parent after their deaths. This can be done by reciting Kaddish for 11 months and on the yarzeit (anniversary of the parent's death), and by donating charity in the memory of the parent. The study of the Torah is also considered to be reverence toward a parent, for it shows that a parent raised a worthy child.

A child must never put a parent to shame, or speak arrogantly to a parent. A person who is told to do something by his/her mother for which his father does not like the result is not permitted to tell his/her father that his/her mother said to do that. This is because this could lead to his/her father cursing his/her mother. A child is not permitted to interrupt or contradict a parent, or to disturb a parent's sleep.

New Testament

In the gospels, Jesus affirmed the importance of honouring one's father and mother (Matthew 15:1–9, Matthew 19:17–19, Mark 10:17–19, Luke 18:18–21) Paul quotes the commandment in his letter to the church in Ephesus:

In his letters to the Romans and Timothy, Paul describes disobedience to parents as a serious sin (Romans 1:29–31, 2 Timothy 3:2).

The words of Jesus and the teaching of Paul indicate that adult children remain obligated to honour their parents by providing for material needs. In the gospels, Jesus is portrayed as angry with some people who avoided materially providing for their parents by claiming the money they would have used was given to God (Matthew 15:3–8, Mark 7:9–12. In these passages, Jesus quotes Isaiah 29:13) According to the Gospel of John, when Jesus was on the cross, he provided for his mother, Mary, by giving the Apostle John the charge to care for her, which John accepted.

According to the gospel of Matthew, the obligation to honour one's parents is bounded by one's obligation to God: "Whoever loves father or mother more than me is not worthy of me." (Matthew 10:37 ESV) Such boundaries, and the primacy of the first commandment itself, lead scholars to conclude that honouring one's parents does not include breaking God's law (i.e., committing a sin) at the behest of a parent.

Paul's instructions to Timothy regarding the physical care of widows include the following:

Christian

Catholicism
The import of honouring father and mother is based on the divine origin of the parental role:

According to the teachings of the Catholic Church, the commandment to honour father and mother reveals God's desired order of charity – first God, then parents, then others. Keeping the commandment to honour father and mother brings both spiritual and temporal rewards of peace and prosperity, while failure to honour parents harms the individual as well as society. The pervasive societal effect of obedience or disobedience to this command is attributed to the status of the family as the fundamental building block of society:

The Gospel of Luke notes that, as a child, Jesus was obedient to his earthly parents. For a child in the home, the commandment to honour parents is comprehensive, excluding immoral actions. Grown children, while not obligated to obedience in the same way, should continue to afford respect for parental wishes, advice and teaching. "Filial respect is shown by true docility and obedience. 'My son, keep your father's commandment, and forsake not your mother's teaching. ... When you walk, they will lead you; when you lie down, they will watch over you...'" (Proverbs 6:20–22)

The Church teaches that adult children have a duty to honour their parents by providing "material and moral support in old age and in times of illness, loneliness, or distress". This honour should be based on the son or daughter's gratitude for the life, love and effort given by the parents and motivated by the desire to pay them back in some measure.

The principle of the commandment is extended to the duty to honour others indirect authority, such as teachers, and employers.  The commandment to honour father and mother also forms a basis for charity to others when each person is seen, ultimately, as "a son or daughter of the One who wants to be called 'our Father'." Thus, charitable actions are viewed as extensions of the honour owed to the heavenly Father.

Orthodox Church
Father Seraphim Stephens sees "Honor" defined as "Love and Respect", and notes that this commandment is positioned between those that address one's obligations to God and those that relate to how one treats others. "It clearly lays the foundation of our relationship to God and to all other people." Richard D. Andrews points out that, "Every time we do something good, just, pure, holy, we bring honour to our parents."

Protestantism
John Calvin describes the sacred origin of the role of the human father (which thus demands honour). The analogy between the honour of parents and the honour of God himself is further strengthened by this understanding that earthly fatherhood is derived from God's Fatherhood.  Thus the duty to honour does not depend on whether the parent is particularly worthy. However, Calvin acknowledges that some fathers are outright wicked and emphasizes there is no excuse for sin in the name of honouring a parent, calling the notion "absurd".

The commentary of John Wesley on the commandment to honour father and mother is consistent with the interpretation in the Catechism of the Catholic Church. He summarizes the actions that express honour as follows: 1. Inward esteem of them, outwardly expressed 2. Obedience to their lawful commands (Ephesians 6:1–3), 3. Submission to their rebukes, instructions and corrections, 4. Acting with consideration of parental advice, direction and consent, 5. Giving comfort and providing for the physical needs of aged parents. Like the Catechism, Wesley also teaches that the commandment includes honouring others in legitimate secular authority. He also encourages people toward honour of those in spiritual leadership with the question, "Have ye all obeyed them that watch over your souls, and esteemed them highly in love for their work's sake?" This question is reminiscent of Paul's statements to the church in Galatia and to Timothy.

Matthew Henry explains that the commandment to honour father and mother applies not only to biological parents but also to those who fulfil the role of mother or father. He uses the example of Esther honouring her guardian and cousin Mordecai:

The commandment itself encourages obedience "so that you may enjoy long life and that it may go well with you". Henry, Wesley and Calvin affirm the applicability of this promise for all who keep the commandment, though each notes that for the New Testament Christian, the promise may be fulfilled as earthly rewards and/or heavenly rewards, as God sees fit in his wisdom and love for the individual.

In his commentary, Calvin notes the harsh consequences required in Exodus and Leviticus for specific failures to keep the commandment. Those who struck or cursed a parent were to be sentenced to death. Persistently disobedient sons were to be brought before the city elders and stoned by the whole community if the parents' testimony was judged to be accurate. Calvin writes that God knew capital punishment for these offences would seem harsh and be difficult to pronounce, even for those responsible for adjudicating the situation. This is why, he argues, the text specifically places responsibility for the consequences on the offender. The severity of the sentence emphasized the importance of removing such behaviour from the community and deterring others who might imitate it.

Although Calvin refers mostly to fathers in his commentary on the commandment to honour father and mother, he writes near the beginning that the commandment mentions both parents on purpose. As described above, Proverbs supports the value of guidance from both father and mother, and Paul specified that children should provide for their own widowed mothers and grandmothers, "which is pleasing to God".

Just as "honour" involves offering profound respect, the opposite of honouring someone is to trivialize him, as if of no importance.

Respect is not something based solely on personal or professional qualifications, but also on the position that God has given that person. In 1 Samuel 26 David spares Saul's life, even at the risk of losing his own, submitting to the authority God had placed over him as anointed king.

Rewards for compliance
This commandment is distinct from the others in that a promise is attached to it: "...so that you may live long in the land the Lord your God is giving you." Deuteronomy 5:16 amplifies this: "...that your days may be prolonged, and that it may be well with you, in the land which the Lord your God is giving you."

Consequences of disobedience
As with most terms of the covenant between God and Israel, there are consequences for disobedience as well as rewards for obedience:

See also
 Biblical law in Christianity
 Filial piety
 Pietas

References

Further reading
 U.S. Catholic Church.  Catechism of the Catholic Church, 2003, Doubleday Religion,   (accessed 1 September 2009)

External links

  A compilation of Jewish theology regarding the commandment to honour father and mother

Ten Commandments
Filial piety
Hebrew Bible words and phrases
Biblical phrases
Positive Mitzvoth